This is a list of the archdeacons of St Asaph. The Archdeacon of St Asaph is the priest in charge of the archdeaconry of St Asaph, an administrative division of the Church in Wales Diocese of St Asaph. The archdeaconry comprises the five rural deaneries of Denbigh, Dyffryn Clwyd, Holywell, Llanrwst/Rhos and St Asaph.

Archdeacons of St Asaph
1170: David
1205–1210: Adam
1231–1240: David
1250:Anian I
1266: David
1268-1293: Anian Schonaw (Anian II)
1277: Gruffudd ab Iorwerth
1293, 1306: Gruffudd
?–1330: Llywellyn ap Hwfa
1331: Llywellyn ap Madog ab Elis
1382–1383: Thomas Rushook (afterwards Bishop of Llandaff, 1383)
1390: Thomas Keler
1398: Griffith le Yonge
?–1402: Ithel ap Robert
1425: Edward Trefor
1442–?1457: John Tupney
<1508–1532: Peter Conway
1535: Richard Shelton
1537: William ap Roberts
1539–1554: Richard Pollard
1539–1554: Thomas Davies (dismissed) 
1554–1558: Humfrey Edwards
1558–1561: Thomas Davies (restored; afterwards Bishop of St Asaph, 1561)
1562–1566: Richard Rogers (later Bishop of Dover, 1569)
1566–1573: Thomas Powell
1573–1844: Post held in commendam by Bishops of St Asaph
1844–1854: Charles Butler Clough (afterwards Dean of St Asaph) 
1854–1877: Robert Wickham
1877-1878: Hugh Morgan
1878-1889:  Edward Smart
1889–1892: Watkin Williams (afterwards Dean of St Asaph, 1892)
1892–1897: Hugh Jones
1897–1910: David Evans
1910–1935: Thomas Lloyd (also Bishop of Maenan, 1928)
1935–1942: Charles Roberts
1942–1959: Richard Roberts
1959–1964: John Edwards
1964–1970: Richard Owen
1970–1974: William Rees
1974–1984: John Jones
1984–1990: Selwyn Closs-Parry
1991–1999: John Davies (afterwards Bishop of St Asaph, 1999)
2000–2011: Bernard Thomas
2011–2014 (ret.): Chris Potter
1 December 20142018 John Lomas
7 October 2018present   Andy Grimwood

References

Archdeacons of St Asaph